Norwegian Olympic Museum  (Norges Olympiske Museum) is located at Maihaugen in Lillehammer, Norway. 

The Norwegian Olympic Museum  shows the history of the Olympic Games in ancient and modern times, with a focus on the 1952 Winter Olympics in Oslo  and 1994 Winter Olympics at Lillehammer. Olympic highlights are presented through interactive installations, multimedia presentations and stories related to authentic objects. In addition to the permanent exhibition, the museum also displays temporary exhibitions with a theme related to sports history and athletic achievements. Paralympics and the Youth Olympics have their own sections in the museum.

The Norwegian Olympic Museum was officially opened by King Harald V and Queen Sonja on November 27, 1997, in Håkons Hall. The museum was reopened as a new modern museum at Maihaugen in 2016. The museum has interactive installations, multimedia presentations and original objects. It is the only museum in northern Europe that presents the entire history of the Olympic Games. The museum has a collection of more than 7,000 Olympic items in all.

“The stories in the museum can be important for young persons because they can inspire them to stay in sports”. Bjørn Dæhlie, Olympic gold medalist

References

External links 
 Official site

Culture in Innlandet
Museums in Innlandet
Olympic museums
Sports museums in Norway
1997 establishments in Norway